De Panne is a town and a municipality located on the North Sea coast of the Belgian province of West Flanders. There it borders France, making it the westernmost town in Belgium. It is one of the most popular resort town destinations within Belgium.

The municipality includes the village of Adinkerke.

On 1 January 2011 De Panne had a total population of 10,748 on a total area of 23.90 km², which gives a population density of 449.7 inhabitants per km².

Miscellaneous
Famous people who have lived or died in De Panne include King Albert I and Queen Elisabeth, and John Aidan Liddell, VC, who died in De Panne in August 1915. The Belgian royal family lived in De Panne during the First World War because it was located in the tiny fraction of their country that was not conquered by the Germans.

De Panne is home to Plopsaland, a theme park aimed at young children and located on the former grounds of Meli Park. De Panne was also the place where the first land yachts intended for sport were built and used by the Dumont brothers in 1898.

On 17 July 1831, Leopold I, the first Belgian king, sailed to Calais from England, and arrived in Belgium in De Panne.  The Leopold I Esplanade, which includes a statue of him, commemorates his arrival.

Since 1977 the town has hosted the Three Days of De Panne cycle race, which is held in the run up to, and traditionally used by riders as preparation for the Tour of Flanders.

Transport
De Panne Railway Station is located in nearby Adinkerke.  There are regular NMBS trains to Brussels.  The line across the border to Dunkirk is out of use. Dk' bus run buses from the station forecourt to Gare de Dunkerque. A cross-border campaign group called Trekhaak-73  is seeking to re-open the railway line.

Belgian Military Cemetery of De Panne
The cemetery is located at Kerkstraat 69 in De Panne, 1 km south of the church. Besides Belgian soldiers who died in the First World War there are also British soldiers who died in the Second World War. 3,744 soldiers have been buried here. Nearby is Adinkerke Military Cemetery.

Images

References

External links

Official website - Information available in Dutch and limited information available in French, English and German

 
Municipalities of West Flanders
Seaside resorts in Belgium